Pierre-Rudolph Mayard (born February 21, 1988), commonly known as Papouche, is a Canadian soccer player who plays as a forward for AS Blainville in the Première Ligue de soccer du Québec.

Club career

Early career
Mayard began his career in 2003, playing with Canadian junior team FC Sélect Rive-Sud. In 2005, he played for the CSR Montréal-Concordia U18 team, winning the silver medal at the Saputo AAA Quebec Cup. In 2006, he joined SC Panellinios Montréal in the Ligue de Soccer Elite Quebec.

In 2003 Mayard also began playing with the Quebec junior select team, with whom he won the 2004 Canadian championships. In 2004, he was also named the youth player of the year in Quebec. He finished third at the Canada games and first at the Adidas cup with the U18 Quebec select team.

Trois-Rivieres Attak
In 2007, he signed with Trois-Rivieres Attak of the Canadian Soccer League. In his debut season he failed to make an appearance due to an injury sustained in a preseason match. He re-signed with the Attak for the 2008 season. He recorded his first goal for the club on June 21, 2008, against TFC Academy. During the regular season he helped the team clinch the National Division title. In the postseason he contributed two goals in a 7–0 victory over Portugal FC. He featured in the CSL Championship final against Serbian White Eagles, where the Attak were defeated in a penalty shootout.

Montreal Impact
The following season on February 27, 2009, he was signed by the Montreal Impact of the USL First Division. During the season he returned to Trois-Rivieres on a loan to win the CSL Championship after defeating Serbia White Eagles in a 3–2 victory in a penalty shootout. Mayard was loaned to the Charleston Battery of the USL Second Division for five months, and returned to the Montreal on August 13, 2010. On March 17, 2010, Mayard's contract was extended until 2011 by the Montreal Impact. He was released by Montreal on October 12, 2011.

Vaasan Palloseura
In 2013, he briefly trialed with Finnish club Vaasan Palloseura, playing two matches including a 2013 Finnish League Cup match against KuPS and scoring in a match against SJK, but the club ultimately did not give him a contract for the season.

Rochester Rhinos
In 2013, he signed with the Rochester Rhinos of the USL PRO, where he appeared in 7 matches

Ottawa Fury
The following year he played with Ottawa Fury in the North American Soccer League.

PLSQ
Following his stint in the NASL he played in the Première Ligue de soccer du Québec with FC L'Assomption-Lanaudière where he scored 13 goals in 15 matches. 

In 2016, he played with AS Blainville, where he won the Ballon D’Or.

International career
Mayard was a member of the U17 national team in 2004 and 2005, and played for the Canadian U-20 team at the 2005 Jeux de la Francophonie, the 2006 Chivas Cup and the 2006 Porto tournament.

Personal life
Mayard is of Haitian descent, has two other brothers who also play professional soccer; Josué Mayard who represents Haiti internationally, and Elkana Mayard.

References

External links

1988 births
Living people
Association football forwards
Canadian soccer players
Soccer people from Quebec
Sportspeople from Laval, Quebec
Canadian sportspeople of Haitian descent
Canadian expatriate soccer players
Expatriate soccer players in the United States
Canadian expatriate sportspeople in the United States
Trois-Rivières Attak players
Montreal Impact (1992–2011) players
Charleston Battery players
Rochester New York FC players
Ottawa Fury FC players
Canadian Soccer League (1998–present) players
USL First Division players
USL Second Division players
USSF Division 2 Professional League players
North American Soccer League players
USL Championship players
Première ligue de soccer du Québec players
Canada men's youth international soccer players
Vaasan Palloseura players
FC St-Léonard players
FC Sélect Rive-Sud players
A.S. Blainville players
FC L'Assomption players